Arthur Burton ( – death unknown) was a professional rugby league footballer who played in the 1900s, 1910s and 1920s. He played at representative level for Yorkshire, and at club level for Lofthouse Albion ARLFC (in Lofthouse, Leeds) (two spells), Leeds (A-Team), and Wakefield Trinity (Heritage № 179), as a forward (prior to the specialist positions of), during the era of contested scrums.

Playing career
Arthur Burton made his début for Wakefield Trinity during the 1909–10 season, and he played his last match for Wakefield Trinity during October 1920, he appears to have scored no drop-goals (or field-goals as they are currently known in Australasia), but prior to the 1974–75 season all goals, whether; conversions, penalties, or drop-goals, scored 2-points, consequently prior to this date drop-goals were often not explicitly documented, therefore '0' drop-goals may indicate drop-goals not recorded, rather than no drop-goals scored. In addition, prior to the 1949–50 season, the archaic field-goal was also still a valid means of scoring points.

County honours
Arthur Burton won cap(s) for Yorkshire while at Wakefield Trinity during the 1913–14 season.

Challenge Cup Final appearances
Arthur Burton played as a forward, i.e. number 13, in Wakefield Trinity's 0-6 defeat by Hull F.C. in the 1914 Challenge Cup Final during the 1913–14 season at Thrum Hall, Halifax, in front of a crowd of 19,000.

References

External links
Search for "Burton" at rugbyleagueproject.org

Place of birth missing
Place of death missing
Rugby league forwards
English rugby league players
Wakefield Trinity players
Year of birth missing
Year of death missing
Yorkshire rugby league team players